The 2011 Formula Future Fiat season was the second Formula Future Fiat season. It began on 27 March at Londrina and will end on October 30 at Velopark, after 12 races to be held at six meetings.

Guilherme Silva won the championship, taking two victories and four second places for a championship-winning margin of 7 points over runner-up Luir Miranda. Miranda talking two wins at Brasilía and Londrina. John Louis finished the season in third place, taking victories at first and second meetings at Interlagos, Londrina and Curitiba. Guilherme Salas and Victor Franzoni earned two wins each.

Drivers
All cars are powered by FPT engines and use Signatech chassis. All drivers were Brazilian-registered.

Race calendar and results
All races were held in Brazil.

Championship Standings
Points were awarded as follows:

References

External links
 Official website of the Formula Future Fiat

Formula Future Fiat